EBOS may refer to:

 EBOS Group Limited, an Australasian marketer, wholesaler, and distributor of medical, and pharmaceutical products
 Ostend–Bruges International Airport (ICAO airport code: EBOS)